DD National (formerly DD1) is a state-owned public entertainment television channel in India. It is the flagship channel of Doordarshan, India's public service broadcaster, and the oldest and most widely available terrestrial television channel in India.

History

1959 to 1982: Beginnings 
On 15 September 1959, at the studio of All India Radio, Delhi, the first TV channel in India started an experimental telecast with a small transmitter and a makeshift studio, adopting the brand Doordarshan, Hindi for television. Until 1965, AIR was responsible for the programming production and overall control over content, as the television service began to assume overall production. Krishi Darshan, Chaupaal, Doordarshan Samachar, and Kalyani were among the first generation of programmes produced for the channel. In 1976, the split of the TV and radio services was made official with Doordarshan assuming overall control for television broadcasting. By the time the Satellite Instructional Television Experiment commmenced in 1975, Doordarshan coordinated with AIR as the producer of programs aired in the targeted areas of several Indian states. It would foreshadow the start of the channel's road to be a nationally aired station. By the time SITE had begun, the channel had only been seen in several Indian major cities.

1982 to 1992: Golden years 
SITE was just a harbinger of many great moments in Doordarshan history. With the launch of the Indian National Satellite System in the 1980s, Doordarshan, as co-partner in the project, took notice of its potential and the federal government began planning to bring Doorsharsan as a national channel aired to millions of Indians. On 15 August 1982, Indedpendence Day, Doordarshan introduced a national colour telecast service from its own TV studio in Mandi House, New Delhi using PAL Colour, and it beamed the celebrations from Red Fort marking the 35th year of nationhood in full colour.

On 9 August 1984, as Doordarshan launched its second channel for the metro/urban audience, 'DD2', the existing first channel was renamed 'DD1' and started regular transmission, beginning nationwide satellite broadcasts. In the same year, DD1 started telecast of sponsored TV serials, which were produced by veteran filmmakers and a number of flim production firms for the channel. These drama series were sponsored by a number of Indian companies. DD1's Hum Log was the first sponsored TV serial of Indian television and started airing with its series premiere on 7 July 1984.

After the success of Hum Log, many other TV producers and filmmakers produced many memorable series aired on DD-1. Some of them, together with the acquired foreign language programming of the period, were Yeh Jo Hai Zindagi, Buniyaad, Malgudi Days, Shrikant, Ramayan, Bharat Ek Khoj, Mahabharat, Mirza Ghalib, The Sword of Tipu Sultan, Chanakya, The Great Maratha, Vishwamitra, Luv Kush Uttar Ramayan, Buddha, Surabhi, Tiltliyan, Taaraa, Star Trek, Khaandaan, 13 Panne, Air Hostess, Waah Janaab, Tamas, Vikram Aur Betal, Tenali Rama, Kirdaar, Singhasan Battisi,Guldasta,Mrignayani,Shrikant,Sadgati, Nukkad, Lot Pot, Mungerilal Ke Haseen Sapne, Bhim Bhawani, Kakkaji Kahin, Paying Guest, Ados Pados, Upannyas, Fauji, Karamchand, Byomkesh Bakshi, Samandar, Param Veer Chakra, Wagle Ki Duniya, Buniyaad, Kachchi Dhoop, Chunauti, Mahanagar, Phir wahi Talash, Umeed, Subah, Mr. Yogi, Circus, Ek Bhool, Chote Babu, Yugantar, Kehkashan, Yatra, Rajni, Street Hawk, Udaan, Gaata Jaaye Banjara, Phool Khile Hain Gulsan Gulsan,Pingu,Circus, Taaj Mahel, Khubsuraat, and Dada Dadi Ki Kahaniya. Many of these productions ended up being high rating successes for DD-1. Of these, Ramayan ended up not just being DD-1's most expensive Indian TV drama of the 80s, but also the highest rating drama of its time.

DD National served as the home for NDTV's smash Friday news program The World This Week from 1984 to 1995. During those years, DD National also aired NDTV-produced network coverage of federal and state elections and budget deliberations of Parliament.

1992 to 2010: Competition 
After the entry of private channels in India, Doordarshan started facing strong competition from Zee TV in 1992. Even though in those days, cable and satellite channels were not easily available, DD1 was still ruling the chart, as it was the only channel available terrestrially. In 1993, Doordarshan revamped both channels for a stronger competition. DD-1 was relaunched into its present name, DD National, while DD-2 received the DD Metro brand.

With the telecast of popular TV shows like Chandrakanta, Alif Laila, Tehkikaat, Chitrahaar, Udaan, Byomkesh Bakshi, Farmaan, Katha Sagar, Neem Ka Ped and Chanakya, DD National retained viewers and the high ratings, but Doordarshan Board focused more on its sister channel, DD Metro, which was aimed to compete with Zee TV. In the meantime, the channel became one of the popular destinations of TV viewers with its shows like Junoon, Superhit Muquabala, and Azanabi, many of its programming being also aired on DD National either on simulcast or tape delay.

In 1995, when most of the channels like DD Metro, Zee TV, Home TV, STAR Plus and Sony TV started focusing on their prime time slots, DD National was still stacked with its role and responsibilities, as at the time it was the only source of news on TV. To provide more entertainment, DD National opened an afternoon slot for housewives, with the telecast of Shanti. To support the success of Shanti, many other shows like Swabhimaan, Farz, and Yug were introduced and all of them were praised.

In 1997, Prasar Bharati, the parent body of Doordarshan, was formed. While private channels like Zee TV, STAR Plus and Sony TV started airing high budget TV serials from top production houses, DD National was still doing the best in afternoon slots with Kasam, Itihaas, Agni, Aprajita, Aurat, Ardhangini, Sanjog, Deewar, Aane Wala Pal, Waqt Ki Raftaar and other programs. There were a few notable programs like India's Most Wanted, Gul Sanobar, Surabhi, Noorjahan, Om namah Shivay, Jai Ganga Maiya, and Suraag in prime time, but those were not enough to give competition to private channels.

In the late 1997, DD National started airing Mukesh Khanna's Shaktimaan, which was the blockbuster TV serial in Indian history. In 2000, after tasting success with India's Most Wanted, Jasoos Vijay and Suraag in prime time, Prasar Bharati decided to revamp both channels, and many new serials were introduced on DD National, but very few of them were successful because of a limited prime time slots of 9 to 10:30, compared to 8 to 11 for other channels. New channels like Sahara TV and SAB TV were also performing better than DD channels in prime time.

In 2002, DD offered its time slots to popular filmmakers and got some popular shows of the time. Ramanand Sagar's Aankhen, BR Chopra's Aap Beeti, Adhikaari Brothers CID Officer, Kiran Bedi's Galti Kiski, and Time's Dishayen were telecast on the channels and prized by viewers. In 2003, when DD Metro Channel was converted into DD News, Prasar Bharati focused on its DD national channels, and shows like Meher, Miss India, Shikwah, Kayamat, Kaanch, and Phir Bhi Dil Hai Hindustani were introduced. Phir Bhi Dil Hai Hindustani achieved unprecedented ratings and became DD National's biggest blockbuster during this period. In 2005, Hawayein starring Ravi Kishan and Malini Kapoor became one of the most popular shows and also won a title of Best TV Serial of the Year at the ITA Awards.

In this period, DD introduced many popular serials like Air Hostess, Wo Huye Na hamare, Kyunki Jeena Isi Ka Naam Hai, Tum Dena Sath Mera, Hari Mirchi lal Mirchi, Soni Mahiwaal, Wheel Smart Shrimati, Krazzy Kiya Re, Chandramukhi, Jo Kahunga Sach Kahunga, Tahreer Munshi Premchand Ki, and Kashmkash Zindagi Ki.

2010 to 2020: Loss of prominence
At prime time, DD was still not able to compete with private channels, and it also started losing its peak position in afternoon slots to re-runs on other channels. In 2012, DD started airing Ekta Kapoor's Pavitra Bandhan, Sanjay Leela Bhansali's Saraswatichandra and a few other serials. In 2013, it reduced its window for regional telecasts to 4 PM-7 PM, and stopped airing news at night, which added one and a half hour to its prime time. To enrich the new four-hour long prime time, DD brought TV serials like Gora, Bharat Ki Shaan, Baba Aazmi's Yeh Kaha Aa Gaye Hum, Dil Jo Kah Na Saka, and Sanjeev Kapoor's Chef Ki Rasoi. It also launched a campaign for its afternoon slots, DD Dophar Aapke Ghar, by airing serials like Amrita, Anudamini, Aisa Prem Kahan, and Chupau Kaise Laaga Chunari Me Daag.

In November 2014, Prasar Bharati relaunched DD National as 'Desh Ka Apna Channel' with a new theme and serials like Happy Homes, Khwabon Ke Darmiyaan, Khamosh Sa Afsaana, Dard Ka Rishta, Shama, Paltan, Stree Shakti, Zindagi Ek Bhanwar, and Janmon Ka Bandhan. Initially, these shows did better, but later, as TRP fell in 2016, Prasar Bharati decided to go for a slot sale policy and invited bids from makers for its 7 PM to 11 PM slot. Afternoon slots in 2016 aired serials like Krantijyoti Savitribai Phule, U-turn, and Munidhar. However, the strategy was not enough for its revival.

In late 2016, the slot sale policy of DD was put on hold by the government. Although many production houses like Balaji Telefilms and SaaiBaba Telefilms had won slots for airing their programs, it could not be commenced as the policy was reported for review. From 2017, Doordarshan has been repeating programs from its library and does not telecast any new serial.

2020 to present 
Due to COVID-19, when all other TV Channels were stopped shooting for fresh episodes of their serials, Doordarshan decided to re-telecast its blockbuster drama programming from the 1980s and 1990s. DD National telecasted repeats of Ramanand Sagar's Ramayana, Uttar Ramayana, Shri Krishna, Mukesh Khanna's Shaktimaan, Shrimaan Shrimati, Shahrukh Khan's Circus, Byomkesh Bakshi, Chanakya, Dekh Bhai Dekh, The Jungle Book and many more. At the same time its sister channel DD Bharati telecasted BR Chopra's Mahabharata, Sai Baba, Alif Laila, BR Chopra's Vishnu Puran and many more hit series.

This move turned out to be a Magic Lamp for the Doordarshan network, as the rerun broadcasts for these drama productions broke all TRP records. First episode of Ramayana gained highest TRP since 2015 for all Hindi TV Channels of All categories. DD National instantly became #1st in TRP chart and with its shows Ramayana and Shaktimaan were on #1st and #5th in Ratings. Note that, since 2010's DD National was out of top 10 in Hindi GEC Ratings.

After Ramayana, Uttar Ramayan and Shri Krishna too enjoyed #1 Rank in BARC TRP Charts.

Its sister channel DD Bharati, which was even not in notice since its inception in 2000, became 5th most-watched TV Channel in TRP Charts, with Mahabharata became #2 on TRP Charts.

Following the success of the reruns, DD National finally regained its status as the country's number 1 station. Bolstered by high ratings of the programming repeats Doordarshan launched DD Retro on 13 April 2020, with its library mainly composed of many of Doordarshan's legendary drama series.

Shortly after Prasar Bharati changed its logo, the broadcaster announced the rebranding of DD National, including its logo, which would be in effect from 15 August 2022, coinciding with the celebrations of Indian Independence day and in celebration of 40 years of nationwide broadcasts. The new logo made its debut on 14 August, one day before the holiday.

Notable anchors 
Over its long journey, being India's biggest public broadcaster, DD National has had a long list of notable anchors. Many on whom are widely recognised faces, distinguished personalities and also people known for their contribution to news and media as well as for their role in popularising Indian art and culture.

 Minu Talwar
 Neelum Sharma
 Nidhi Kumar
 Pratima Puri - The channel's first news reader
 Rini Simon Khanna
 Salma Sultan
 Shammi Narang
 Sunit Tandon

Sports broadcasting 
Usually, all One Day and Twenty20 international cricket matches involving or hosted by India are shown live on DD National. It also broadcast the 2014 Men's Hockey World Cup matches involving India, and also the semi-final and final matches. The ICC Champions Trophy was also broadcast by DD National.

These matches are broadcast under compulsory simulcasts from pay television rightsholders such as Star Sports, under laws requiring sporting events of national importance to be simulcast by DD National. In 2017, in response to complaints by Tata Sky, the Supreme Court of India ruled that these simulcasts are only allowed to be carried by on the free-to-air terrestrial and DD Free Dish, and that DD National must be blacked out on pay television providers in defense of the pay-television rightsholder when such events are broadcast.

Since then, Prasar Bharati decided to telecast Cricket Matches only on DD Sports Channel, and since then all matches were telecasted on DD Sports channel, but only on DD Freedish, DTT mode with different feed named DD Sports 2.0.

Editorial independence 
The idea of autonomy for the government-controlled Doordarshan was first mooted when the Janata Party came to power in 1977, in the aftermath of Emergency when the Doordarshan ended up as the government's mouthpiece. The idea was revived when the Janata Dal took office in 1989. The following governments showed no interest in autonomy despite making politically correct noises about autonomy.

Test cards

Programming

See also 
 List of television channels in India

References

External links 
 Official website

Doordarshan
Hindi-language television channels in India
Television channels and stations established in 1959
Television stations in New Delhi